Henry II of Świdnica, (– ), was a Duke of Świdnica from 1326 until his death (with his brother as co-ruler).

He was the second and younger son of Duke Bernard of Świdnica by his wife Kunigunde, daughter of Władysław I the Elbow-high, Duke of Kuyavia and since 1320 King of Poland.

Life
Henry's exact date of birth is unknown, but was assumed that he was significantly younger than his older brother Bolko II the Small, because he was first mentioned only in 1337. He co-ruled with his brother since 1326 after their father's death, but at the end Bolko II take all the government into his hands.

Marriage and issue
By 1 June 1338 Henry II married with Katharina (d. bef. 29 June 1355), daughter of King Charles I of Hungary, from the House of Capet in the Anjou branch. They had only one daughter:
Anna (b. 1339 - d. Prague, 11 July 1362), married on 27 May 1353 with Charles IV of Luxembourg, King of Bohemia and Holy Roman Emperor.

The birth of his daughter, future Holy Roman Empress, was the only important event of Henry II's life, according to the contemporary chronicles. He died by 28 June 1345. It's unknown where he was buried.

References
 
 
 Genealogy of the Dukes of Świdnica
 Genealogical database by Herbert Stoyan

Literature
 Joachim Bahlcke, Schlesien und die Schlesier, Langen-Müller-Verlag, 2000,  
 H. Grünhagen: Geschichte Schlesiens, Breslau 1878 
 Heinrich II. (Schweidnitz). In: Allgemeine Deutsche Biographie (ADB). Band 11, Duncker & Humblot, Leipzig 1880, S. 615. 

1316 births
1345 deaths
Piast dynasty
Dukes of Silesia